Clare Smales (born 30 August 1975) is a British journalist.

She was educated at St Mary's School, Shaftesbury and University College, Durham (English Literature).

She worked at the Mail on Sunday newspaper from 1998 until 2003 as a feature writer and as the deputy property editor. This was followed by a spell as deputy editor and Managing Editor of Vogue magazine at Condé Nast.

She is now a freelance property and travel journalist, living in Cornwall.

She is married to former Olympic Gold medallist Ed Coode and has two daughters Beatrice and Ottilie & two sons, Johnny and Wilf.

References 

Living people
1975 births
People from Shaftesbury
English journalists
People educated at St Mary's School, Shaftesbury
Alumni of University College, Durham